Fabian Tillanen (8 May 1895, Mäntyharju – 16 September 1976) was a Finnish farmer and politician. He was a Member of the Parliament of Finland from 1947 to 1948, representing the Finnish People's Democratic League (SKDL).

References

1895 births
1976 deaths
People from Mäntyharju
People from Mikkeli Province (Grand Duchy of Finland)
Finnish People's Democratic League politicians
Members of the Parliament of Finland (1945–48)